Bere may refer to:

Places
 Bere, Botswana, a village
 Béré, Burkina Faso, a city
 Bere Department, Burkina Faso
 Béré, Chad, a city
 Béré Region, Woroba District, Ivory Coast
 Bere Bay, Nunavut, Canada
 Early name for the village of Beercrocombe in Somerset, England
 Alternative spelling for Beer, Somerset in Aller, Somerset, England
 Forest of Bere, Hampshire, England
 Bere or Beara peninsula, Ireland 
 Bere or Bear (barony), County Cork; on the peninsula
 Bere Island, in the barony
 Bere, the Hungarian name for Berea village, Ciumești Commune, Satu Mare County, Romania

Other uses
 Bere (surname) (including a list of people with the name)
 Bere (grain), a barley cultivar

See also
 De la Bere baronets
 Beres (disambiguation)
 Beer (disambiguation)
 Bier (disambiguation)
 Biar (disambiguation)